Body of Soul is the third studio album by Alfonzo Blackwell released in 1998. The album peaked at No. 14 on the Billboard Contemporary Jazz Albums chart and No. 19 on the  Billboard  Jazz Albums chart.

Overview
Artists such as Preston Glass and Sheldon Reynolds appeared upon the album.

References

1998 albums